The following is a list of presidents of ICC (International Cricket Council), the international governing body of cricket. 

The President of the ICC was largely an honorary position since changes pushed through to the ICC constitution in 2014 handed control to the so-called 'Big Three' of England Cricket Board, Board of Control for Cricket in India and Cricket Australia. Zaheer Abbas served as the last president of ICC.

In 2016, the position of the president of ICC was abolished, with the Chairman becoming an honorary position. 

Colin Cowdrey and Clyde Walcott also served as the Chairman of the ICC. Until 1989, the President of Marylebone Cricket Club automatically assumed the chairmanship of the ICC. However even after Cowdrey's appointment, the ICC was still administered by the Secretary of the Marylebone Cricket Club.
Percy Sonn died on May 27, 2007, while still the President of the ICC. He was succeeded by fellow South African Ray Mali.
Mustafa Kamal resigned from his post making the allegation that the organisation was run unconstitutionally as he was barred from handing out the champion Trophy to Australia in the 2015 ICC Cricket World Cup.
Zaheer Abbas served as the last president of ICC. In 2016 the position of the president of ICC was abolished.

References

Presidents of the International Cricket Council
Cricket-related lists